Alvin Ferdinand Weichel (September 11, 1891 – November 27, 1956) was an American politician who served as a Republican member of the U.S. House of Representatives from Ohio from 1943 to 1955.

Life and politics
Weichel was born in Sandusky, Ohio, three of his grandparents were German immigrants.  During World War I, he enlisted on December 14, 1917, and assigned to Company P, Ordnance Training Camp, and later to Headquarters Supply Company at Camp Hancock, Georgia, and was discharged a sergeant on January 31, 1919.  He was appointed second lieutenant, Ordnance Section, Officers' Reserve Corps, December 10, 1918, and commission terminated December 8, 1928.  He was graduated from Ferris Institute in Big Rapids, Michigan, from the University of Michigan at Ann Arbor, and from the University of Michigan Law School in 1924.  He was admitted to the bar in 1924.  He served as commissioner of insolvents for the State of Ohio, and prosecuting attorney of Erie County, Ohio, from 1931 to 1937.  He served as special counsel for the attorney general of Ohio and a lecturer for the School Police Administration at the Ohio State University in Columbus, Ohio.

Weichel was elected as a Republican to the Seventy-eighth and to the five succeeding Congresses.  He served as chairman of the United States House Committee on Merchant Marine and Fisheries during the Eightieth and Eighty-third Congresses.  He was not a candidate for renomination in 1954.  He resumed the practice of law and died in Sandusky, Ohio, on November 27, 1956.  Interment in Calvary Cemetery.

References
 Retrieved on 2009-03-01
The Political Graveyard

1891 births
1956 deaths
American military personnel of World War I
Ohio State University faculty
American people of German descent
Politicians from Sandusky, Ohio
University of Michigan Law School alumni
Ferris State University alumni
United States Army officers
County district attorneys in Ohio
20th-century American politicians
Republican Party members of the United States House of Representatives from Ohio